From the total of  stars known to have exoplanets (as of ), there are a total of  known multiplanetary systems, or stars with at least two confirmed planets, beyond the Solar System. This list includes systems with at least three confirmed planets or two confirmed planets where additional candidates have been proposed. The stars with the most confirmed planets are Sol (the Solar System's star, also referred to as the Sun) and Kepler-90 with 8 confirmed planets each, followed by TRAPPIST-1 with 7 planets. 

The  multiplanetary systems are listed below according to the star's distance from Earth. Proxima Centauri, the closest star to the Solar System, has three planets (b, c and d). The nearest system with four or more confirmed planets is Tau Ceti, with four known. The farthest confirmed multiplanetary system is OGLE-2012-BLG-0026L, at 13,300 ly away.

The table below contains information about the coordinates, spectral and physical properties, and the number of confirmed (unconfirmed) planets for systems with at least 2 planets and 1 not confirmed. The two most important stellar properties are mass and metallicity because they determine how these planetary systems form. Systems with higher mass and metallicity tend to have more planets and more massive planets. However, although low metallicity stars tend to have fewer massive planets, particularly hot-Jupiters, they also tend to have a larger number of close-in planets, orbiting at less than 1 AU.

Multiplanetary systems

Stars orbited by both planets and brown dwarfs
Stars orbited by objects on both sides of the 13 Jupiter mass dividing line.

 54 Piscium (HD 3651)
 HD 168443
 Gliese 229 A
 Epsilon Indi
 HD 82943
 Pi Mensae

See also

References

List
Multiplanetary systems